Fallingwater is a 2013 concerto for solo violin and string orchestra by the American composer Michael Daugherty, inspired by four of Frank Lloyd Wright's buildings: Taliesin, Fallingwater, Unity Temple and the Guggenheim Museum. The work was commissioned by the director of the New Century Chamber Orchestra, Nadja Salerno-Sonnenberg, who gave the premiere on November 20, 2013.

Movements
Nightrain
On the Level
Prairie Psalm
Ahead of the Curve

Discography
From A to Z: 21st Century Concertos. Assad / Bolcom / Daugherty / Zwilich. NSS Music, November 2013.

References

Concertos by Michael Daugherty
2013 compositions
Violin concertos
Compositions for string orchestra
Frank Lloyd Wright
Music commissioned by orchestras